Sophora violacea (S. rubriflora ) grows naturally in the west of the Sri Lanka from north to south east and Java

References

violacea